Norton Lakeside Halt railway station is a heritage railway station on the Chasewater Railway in Staffordshire.  It is a simple halt, consisting of a single platform, with no station building and no loops or sidings.  It is situated in Chasewater Country Park.  To the west is Brownhills West railway station and to the east is Chasewater Heaths railway station.

Heritage railway stations in Staffordshire
Railway stations built for UK heritage railways